Herbert Chikomba (born 18 May 1995) is a Zimbabwean first-class cricketer. He was part of Zimbabwe's squad for the 2014 ICC Under-19 Cricket World Cup.

References

External links
 

1995 births
Living people
Zimbabwean cricketers
Sportspeople from Mashonaland East Province